Hypochaetopsis is a genus of bristle flies in the family Tachinidae.

Species
Hypochaetopsis chaetosa Townsend, 1915

Distribution
Peru.

References

Dexiinae
Diptera of South America
Tachinidae genera
Taxa named by Charles Henry Tyler Townsend
Monotypic Brachycera genera